The regency government of the Kingdom of England of 1422 to 1437 ruled while Henry VI was a minor.  Decisions were made in the king's name by the Regency Council, which was made up of the most important and influential people in the government of England, and dominated by the king's uncle Humphrey, Duke of Gloucester (brother of the king's father and predecessor, Henry V) and Bishop (Cardinal from 1426) Henry Beaufort (Gloucester's half-uncle).

The individuals who constituted the Regency Council as at 9 December 1422 were :

 John, Duke of Bedford
 Humphrey, Duke of Gloucester
 Thomas Beaufort, Duke of Exeter
 Henry Beaufort, Bishop of Winchester
 Henry Chichele, Archbishop of Canterbury
 John Kemp, Bishop of London
 Philip Morgan, Bishop of Worcester
 John Wakering, Bishop of Norwich
 Ralph Neville, 1st Earl of Westmorland
 Henry Percy, 2nd Earl of Northumberland
 John Mowbray, 2nd Duke of Norfolk
 Edmund Mortimer, 5th Earl of March
 Richard Beauchamp, 13th Earl of Warwick 
 Henry FitzHugh, 3rd Baron FitzHugh
 Sir John Tiptoft
 Ralph Cromwell, 3rd Baron Cromwell 
 Sir Walter Hungerford
 Sir Walter Beauchamp

Although the nominal leadership of the regency lay with John, Duke of Bedford (Gloucester's older brother), he spent most of his time ruling the English territories in France. Gloucester thus took the post of Lord Protector of the Realm in order to rule England while Bedford was absent. In practice, however, he was forced to share power with Cardinal Henry Beaufort, who held the position of Lord Chancellor and led a regency council composed of England's prominent magnates. Much of the period was marked by quarrels and disputes between Gloucester and the cardinal. Tensions between both parties could be seen in events such as the Parliament of Bats.

The Council soon split along lines of opposition and support to the continuation of the war in France. Gloucester had always been fervently in favour of finishing the war his brother had started in France and seeing it through to victory at any price. However, in the face of a resurgent French army led by Joan of Arc and the crowning of the Dauphin as Charles VII in 1429, it became clear that the French were gaining the upper hand and slowly expelling the English from their country. A peace party emerged led by Cardinal Beaufort, who saw the war as a drain on resources and unwinnable.

However, for most of the period the regency council was able to govern effectively and fairly. The splits became most evident towards the end. In 1432, Anne of Burgundy died; she was the younger sister of Philip the Good, Duke of Burgundy. Anne had been the wife of John, Duke of Bedford, and their marriage was instrumental in maintaining the alliance between England and Burgundy against France. However, following her death, Bedford married Jacquetta of Luxembourg, which the Duke of Burgundy disapproved of and Burgundy made peace with France. With the loss of the alliance with Burgundy, Bedford became convinced that peace was the only solution, but at a conference arranged in Arras in 1435, the English delegation refused to give up their claim to the French throne. Bedford died just after the conference and was replaced with Richard, Duke of York who did not favour the peace policy.

When Henry finally came of age in 1437, he took over at just about the worst time possible, when splits about the war and rivalries between the various nobles were at their deepest. The Crown had suffered huge war debts, and there was general lack of leadership in the French territories which seemed to be slipping slowly but surely out of English hands.

See also
 Dual monarchy of England and France
 England in the Late Middle Ages
 Parliament of Bats
 Readeption of King Henry VI
 Regency era

References

 
 
 
 
 

Political history of medieval England
15th century in England
Henry VI of England
English ministries
Regency (government)
1422 establishments in England
1437 disestablishments in England